The 1955 World Archery Championships was the 17th edition of the event. It was held in Helsinki, Finland on 19–22 July 1955 and was organised by World Archery Federation (FITA).

Medals summary

Recurve

Medals table

References

External links
 World Archery website
 Complete results

World Championship
World Archery
A
World Archery Championships
International sports competitions in Helsinki
July 1955 sports events in Europe
1950s in Helsinki